The National Library of the Republic of Tatarstan is the main state book depository in Tatarstan for national, republican, Russian and foreign publications. It holds over three million documents, including over 100,000 documents in the Tatar language and another 100,000 in foreign languages. [1] It “is the centre of the propagation of the culture of the Tatar people, a unique public library performing the functions of acquisition, preservation and distribution of Tatar books and literature of the republic.” [2]

The library is located in Kazan, the capital of Tatarstan at Kremlevskaya St. 33. It is housed in a well-known historical mansion - Ushkova house. It is open to the public.

The library officially opened as the city public library on 10 January 1865. It was started based upon the collection of Ivan Vtorov, a local bibliophile. The collection of 1,908 volumes (903 titles) was donated to the city by his son in 1844.

External links
 Interview with library staff and Mr. Razil Ismagilovich Valeev, Member of the Presidium of the State Sovet of the Republic of Tatarstan, Chairman of the Committee for Culture, Science, Education and National Questions. Kazan, 24 July 2008.
 Library website, http://kitaphane.tatarstan.ru/

Education in Tatarstan
Buildings and structures in Kazan
Libraries in Russia
Library buildings completed in 1865
1865 establishments in the Russian Empire
Libraries established in 1865